Swordsman was a free-to-play massively multiplayer online role-playing game (MMORPG) by Perfect World Entertainment.

Story
Swordsman is based upon the novel The Smiling, Proud Wanderer (Xiao Ao Jiang Hu) by Louis Cha, the best-selling Chinese writer alive at the time. He’s famed for his wuxia novels, with over 100 million copies of his works sold worldwide. As part of the wuxia genre of Chinese martial arts and chivalry, in Swordsman, the player takes the role of a wandering hero and experiences the hero’s rise to glory amongst one of ten schools of martial arts, the quest to avenge the hero’s destroyed village, and the opportunity to adventure with great heroes around the world.

Gameplay
Swordsman gameplay has a focus on action-oriented combat that is less focused on stats and more on player skill. Players can excel through character mobility, aerial combat, twitch reflexes, dodging, and dynamic combat styles inspired by martial arts.

Zones dynamically transform as a result of player actions and the actions of player guilds. As players move through the main story, the environment may change based on their decisions. Towns will be destroyed or saved, new NPCs and quest givers will appear, and secret rooms will be revealed. Players can see the effects of their decisions reflected in the balance between good and evil in each zone.

Martial Arts Schools
Players are able to choose from one of 11 different schools of combat including Shaolin, Wu-tang, Five Venoms, Splendor, Infinity, Sun and Moon Cult, Zephyr, House Tong, Harmony, E'mei, Falconer and the newly released class Grace.

Each school representing a different class also consists of different skill sets and usage in different weapons which expands on personal preferences and uniqueness for any player.

References 

2014 video games
Free online games
Inactive massively multiplayer online games
Massively multiplayer online role-playing games
Perfect World games
Products and services discontinued in 2018
Products introduced in 2014
Video games based on Chinese mythology
Video games developed in China
Windows games
Windows-only games